Philippe Colin (born 14 September 1979) is a French sprint canoer who has competed since the late 2000s. He won three medals at the ICF Canoe Sprint World Championships with two golds (K-2 1000 m: 2007, K-4 1000 m: 2010) and a silver (K-4 1000 m: 2009).

Colin also finished sixth in the K-2 1000 m event at the 2008 Summer Olympics in Beijing.

References
Canoe09.ca profile

External links
 
 

1979 births
Canoeists at the 2008 Summer Olympics
French male canoeists
Living people
Olympic canoeists of France
Sportspeople from Besançon
ICF Canoe Sprint World Championships medalists in kayak
Mediterranean Games silver medalists for France
Mediterranean Games medalists in canoeing
Competitors at the 2005 Mediterranean Games